Queen of Hearts (The Queen) is a 2019 Danish drama film directed by May el-Toukhy, and starring Trine Dyrholm and Gustav Lindh. The Danish and English film titles obliquely refer to the Queen of Hearts character in the children's book Alice's Adventures in Wonderland which is mentioned repeatedly in the film. The film was selected as the Danish entry for the Best International Feature Film at the 92nd Academy Awards, but it was not nominated. The film won the 2019 Nordic Council Film Prize.

Plot 
Handsome Anne is a lawyer shown working on three cases of rape and violent abuse of young women. She is married to a physician, Peter, and they have two young twin daughters, Frida and Fanny. Peter's teenage son from his past marriage is Gustav, who lives in Sweden with his mother Rebecca. The family plans for Gustav to move in with Anne and Peter. Gustav arrives and Anne cannot refrain from flirting with him. Gustav begins to conflict with Peter, pushing for the right to move out on his own despite being a minor. One day, Anne returns home to find there has been a burglary. The incident is reported to the police, but afterwards Anne finds an item in Gustav's laundry that was in her bag, stolen during the break-in. She realizes he was responsible for the robbery and confronts Gustav with the evidence. However, Anne promises to keep the matter a secret if Gustav does his part in the household. From then on Gustav actually cheerfully joins in the social life of the family, for instance reading the Danish version of Alice's Adventures in Wonderland aloud for the young twin girls, which Anne herself also does. (The film title alludes obliquely to the Queen character in Alice's Adventures in Wonderland.) Time passes and one night, Gustav brings his girlfriend Amanda home. Anne hears the couple having sex and is aroused.

Peter and Anne entertain guests on their balcony, but Anne leaves the group to take Gustav to a bar. There, she kisses him. Later at night, she enters his bedroom and seduces him by initiating sex. The two begin a sexual relationship; Gustav interviews Anne with a tape recorder, asking her various questions including about her first sexual relationship. Anne says it was with someone she should not have had sex with - like we have? asks Gustav, but she does not want to talk about it. The family celebrates Frida and Fanny's birthday. When Anne and Gustav step away, Gustav kisses her. A guest, Anne's sister Lina, witnesses the encounter and, upset, leaves the party. Anne fears Lina will tell Peter, and breaks off her relationship with Gustav.

Gustav and Peter leave to spend time at their cabin in the woods. After their return Peter tells Anne that Gustav wants to go to a boarding school, and had told his father what had happened between Anne and himself. After a pause Anne hysterically denies the accusation, saying Gustav hates her for ending Peter and Rebecca's marriage. She also tells Peter that Gustav was responsible for the burglary. Anne, Peter, and Gustav then sit down together, where Anne continues to deny the affair. Gustavs departs for a boarding school. Much later Gustav visits the office of Anne and threatens to report her for the illegal affair, but she replies he is not a credible witness and never will be believed. He calls on her house at night asking for his father but he is rejected by Anne who leaves him weeping on the ground. At a party for Anne Peter is called with the message that Gustav goes missing from his school. Peter is called to Stockholm by the police. It turns out a hunter has discovered Gustav's body near the cabin, where he froze to death. When Anne tells Peter that Gustavs death is not his fault, Peter violently silences her. The family of Peter, Anne and the two young girls in black drive in silence in their car, presumably to Gustav's funeral.

Cast 
 Trine Dyrholm as Anne
 Gustav Lindh as Gustav
 Magnus Krepper as Peter
 Preben Kristensen as Erik
  as Karsten
  as Janus
  as Louise

Production
In reference to the sex scenes, Trine Dyrholm said, "We had the first meeting about the nude scenes very early on with both the producer and the director. They told us what they had in mind. And we agreed that you could go to the producer along the way if there was something someone didn't want to go along with. We were even sent storyboard illustrations of the scene frame by frame, and the prosthetics that would resemble the male genitalia were made. I would almost compare working on nude scenes here to working on a stunt scene. When you have to do that kind of scene, it's always a bit awkward, but because it was such a safe working space and everything was agreed in advance, it worked."

Reception 
On Rotten Tomatoes the film has an approval rating of  based on  reviews. The site's critical consensus reads, "Led by an exceptional performance from Trine Dyrholm, Queen of Hearts is a bold and uncompromising look at the darkness that can lie within family, directed with formidable skill by May El-Toukhy." Especially Dyrholm's performance was praised. Guy Lodge of Variety magazine called it "[A] sleek, engrossing melodrama..."

The film won nine Robert Awards, including Best Danish Film. It also won four Bodil Awards, including Best Danish Film.

See also 
 List of submissions to the 92nd Academy Awards for Best International Feature Film
 List of Danish submissions for the Academy Award for Best International Feature Film
 Queen of Hearts (Alice's Adventures in Wonderland), which the film title alludes to
 Joseph_(Genesis)#Potiphar's_house, related Biblical story
 Festen (1998) and The Hunt (Jagten, 2012), recent Danish films by Tomas Winterberg with related sexual themes.

References

External links 
 
 
 

2019 drama films
2019 films
Best Danish Film Bodil Award winners
Best Danish Film Robert Award winners
Danish drama films
2010s Danish-language films
Films scored by Jon Ekstrand